Grenada–United Kingdom relations are bilateral relations between Grenada and the United Kingdom. Grenada has a high commission in London. The United Kingdom has a high commission in St. George's. Both countries are full members of the Commonwealth of Nations.

Today
As Commonwealth realms, the two countries share a monarch, King Charles III, and both are active members of the United Nations, the Commonwealth of Nations, the Commonwealth Parliamentary Association and the African, Caribbean and Pacific–EU's Joint Parliamentary Assembly.

Economy
The British-based telecommunications company Cable and Wireless, (since re-branded as Landline, Internet, Mobile and Entertainment LIME), is the incumbent telephone service provider for the entire country of Grenada.

Migration

To Grenada
A poll conducted by the British Broadcasting Corporation (BBC) found that there were roughly 2,500 persons identified as British citizens living abroad in Grenada.

To the United Kingdom 

In the 2001 UK Census showed over 9,783 Grenadian born people residing in the United Kingdom.

Diplomacy
On January 20, 2012, Grenada held the 7th UK-Caribbean Forum at the Grenadian By Rex Resort. The main agenda of this meeting was establishing priority areas for cooperation, discussing key areas of concern and proposing mechanisms to facilitate greater collaboration. The United Kingdom's Foreign Secretary, the Hon. William Hague attend to the meeting.

Bilateral agreements

See also 
High Commission of Grenada, London
List of High Commissioners of Grenada to the United Kingdom

References

External links 
The British Foreign and Commonwealth office - Grenada Profile
Department for International Development (DFID) Caribbean Regional Office

 
Bilateral relations of the United Kingdom
United Kingdom
Relations of colonizer and former colony